Deathconsciousness is the debut studio album by American rock duo Have a Nice Life, released on January 24, 2008 on Enemies List Home Recordings. Recorded independently by the band members on a budget of less than $1,000, Deathconsciousness was released as a double album; the first disc is entitled "The Plow That Broke the Plains" and the second is entitled "The Future". The original cover art features a darkened version of the painting The Death of Marat. 

The album received little attention from professional music publications upon its release, but spread through internet message boards and memes. In 2019, Kerrang! noted that it "quickly became a viral hit amongst internet communities like /mu/, Sputnikmusic, and rateyourmusic. Aided by their relative anonymity and Deathconsciousness’ ominous liner notes, which described a fictional medieval cult that worshipped God’s murderer, Dan and Tim quickly became the stuff of internet myth."

Composition and music
Band member Dan Barrett was quoted as saying, "The lyrics were written simultaneously with the songs, though I tend to work in scraps... I'm constantly writing, then culling pieces that I think fit the music to build entire songs around. At the time I had a job where I would have to be into work at 4:30 in the morning, alone in a giant building, at a desk in front of a giant window. I wrote reams and reams during that time." Regarding how the project came to fruition, Barrett remarked that "We didn’t have a grand plan for it. A couple things ended up happening. We were recording songs and we had a bunch of stuff we didn’t know what to do with. We had a lot of material always because we would just get together and always write new stuff, and never work on the old stuff. I think it started coming together as a project, like my dad passed away and I think that sort of threw things sharply into focus."

In an online Q&A session, Barrett commented on the notoriously lo-fi sound achieved on the album, mentioning how "a lot of Deathconsciousness was recorded through the pinhole mic on [his] laptop". The whole album was recorded with a budget of less than $1,000 USD. The Flenser label owner  Jonathan Tuite said: "This is a record was created with tools that are available to anyone. Pretty easily, very cheaply, a lot of the sounds are probably presets, and it didn’t need a lot of tweaking. It’s kind of like a record made by an everyman, even though it’s a work of near-genius."

The album's style has been described as dark ambient and gothic rock; its tone "apocalyptic". Deathconsciousness is a concept album; Jayson Heller of Pitchfork identified the thesis of the album as the view that "Existence is bleak, gallows humor undergirds it, and sometimes wallowing in that sick paradox is the best revenge".

Barrett picked "The Big Gloom", his personal favorite, as the most emotional song on the album to put together, while Tim Macuga chose "Earthmover", specifically the loud ending. The iconic "bass drop" at the end of the song came from Macuga slamming his bass guitar onto the floor out of frustration and leaving the room as a result of recording difficulties.

The original master recordings of the album were lost during a hard drive crash, leaving the band with only 192 bit rate MP3 files.

Release 
A 70-page booklet written by Dan Barrett accompanied the album. It details the life, death, and teachings of Antiochus, the leader of a fictional religious sect created by Barrett. The album was reissued in 2009 by Enemies List, re-pressing the album on vinyl and CD, with new cover art. The reissue included a 70-page booklet with various paintings and lyrics. Another reissue of Deathconsciousness was released September 17, 2014 by Enemies List and The Flenser.

Reception and legacy
The album received little to no attention from music publications upon its release, although Nick Greer of Sputnikmusic gave it four-and-a-half stars out of five and the album placed at No. 94 on the website's Top 100 Albums of the Decade list.

Though the band members expected it to linger in obscurity, the album has, in the years following its release, gained a substantial cult following, especially in online music communities such as 4chan's /mu/, the website's imageboard for musical discussion, where it is considered an "essential" album. The album is also acclaimed on the Reddit community r/Indieheads. Mike LeSuer of Flood described the album as a "meme-worthy cultural moment". As of 2019, the album had been re-issued seven times. Also in 2019, the band performed the album in its entirety at the Dutch metal festival Roadburn.

Barrett said, "We saw an Italian magazine put it on the best albums of the year list next to Portishead and Meshuggah and thought, ‘Oh god, they think we’re a real band!’"

The opening track "A Quick One Before the Eternal Worm Devours Connecticut" was sampled by producer John Mello for a song by rapper Lil Peep on a track titled "Shiver". Macuga remarked, “I recorded that guitar part in my bathtub and now it’s on the front page of Us Weekly for a rapper’s eulogy.”

Accolades

Track listing

References

2008 albums
Have a Nice Life albums
The Flenser albums